DVA is a Czech alternative rock music duo consisting of the siblings Bára Kratochvílová and Jan Kratochvíl.
DVA have described their style as "folk music of nonexistent nations", which consists of a mix of tango, cabaret, circus, pop, beatboxing, freak folk, and acoustic electro, among a variety of other eclectic styles. The lyrics of their songs are made up of nonsensical words that mix German, Hungarian, and Swedish, among others.

History
DVA (which means "two" in Czech) was formed in 2006 by Bára Kratochvílová and Jan Kratochvíl, who were both previously associated with Divadlo DNO in Hradec Králové. They simultaneously launched their own home-based record label, Label Home Table. Their debut album, titled Fonók, was released in 2008. They followed it a year later with Kollektt8, a collection of unreleased tracks, which they gave away for free.
The duo has since released two further studio albums, HU in 2010 and Nipomo in 2014.
Dva's stage performances are often accompanied by projections created by Markéta Lisá and Magdalena Hrubá (under the name 2M) from the electro group Midi lidi.

Video game soundtracks
In 2012, DVA composed the soundtrack for the Amanita Design video game Botanicula. The record received an Independent Game Festival Award for Excellence in Audio. In 2018, the duo wrote the soundtrack for another video game by Jaromír Plachý, this one titled Chuchel. They named the album Cherries on Air. The soundtrack was released as their sixth album.
In 2021, Dva published the soundtrack for the latest Amanita Design project, also designed by Jaromír Plachý, titled Happy Game.

Band members
 Bára Kratochvílová – vocals, wind instruments
 Jan Kratochvíl – guitar, banjo, looping, beatboxing, vocals

Touring members
 2M (Magdalena Hrubá and Markéta Lisá) – projections

Discography
Studio albums
 Fonók (2008)
 Kollektt8 (2009)
 HU (2010)
 Nipomo (2014)

Soundtracks
 Lappop (Soundtrack to the play Ledové techno, tedy lapohádky – 2007)
 Mélies (Soundtrack to Georges Méliès films – 2008)
 Caligari (Original music for reinterpretation of The Cabinet of Dr. Caligari – 2008)
 Vše pro dobro světa a Nošovic (Documentary soundtrack – 2010)
 Medvědí ostrovy (Documentary soundtrack – 2010)
 Botanicula – (Video game soundtrack – 2012)
 Cherries on Air – (Chuchel soundtrack – 2018)
 Happy Game – (Video game soundtrack – 2021)

Other albums
 Bezděčné vítězství (Radio play broadcast – 2006)
 Nunovó Tango (Mini-album – 2006)
 Elektro a kusto (Mini-album – 2006)
 Kapitán Demo (Compilation of Nunovó Tango, Elektro a kusto, Lappop, Caligari, Zvonění do mobilních telefonů, et al. – 2007)
 Zvonění do mobilních telefonů (2008)

Selected awards
 Nominated at the 2008 Anděl Awards for Best Alternative Music Album, Fonók
 2010 Anděl Award, Best Alternative Music Album for HU

References

External links

 

Czech alternative rock groups
Video game musicians
Musical groups established in 2006
Video gaming in the Czech Republic
Male–female musical duos